Anglesea Heath is a  area of natural heath, woodland and forest in Victoria, south-eastern Australia.

Anglesea Heath is subject to a cooperative management agreement between the Secretary of the Department of Sustainability and Environment, Victoria and Alcoa, and is managed by Parks Victoria. The Heath is notable for its floristic value, and is listed on the now-defunct Australian Register of the National Estate for its botanical value.

References

External links
 

Protected areas of Victoria (Australia)
Victorian places listed on the defunct Register of the National Estate